The Cyprus International Film Festival  (CYIFF) is an annual film festival held in Cyprus. The festival has taken place in Nicosia and more recently in Paphos, in cooperation with Cultural International Festivals.

Description
The International Film Festival of Cyprus has operated since 2006 as an independent non-profit organisation. CYIFF is the first international film festival held in Cyprus with a competition section in categories that include feature, short, animation, video art/dance/music, humanitarian, sport, and children's films, devoted exclusively to independent emerging filmmakers.

Awards and features
The CYIFF Golden Aphrodite and other awards are selected by a jury committee; it also features seminars, workshops and conferences for upcoming directors.

The festival offers the opportunity to young aspiring directors from all over the world, to present their work in front of a jury committee and to receive a form of recognition through one of the awards.

See also
List of Cypriot films
Aphrodite

References

External links 
 

Film festivals in Cyprus
Recurring events established in 2004
Autumn events in Cyprus